Patryk Stefański (born March 12, 1990 in Mysłowice) is a Polish footballer who currently plays for Polonia Bytom.

Career

Club
Stefański made his Ekstraklasa debut on 21.11.2009. In February 2011, he was loaned to Zagłębie Sosnowiec on a half year deal.

References

External links
 
 

1990 births
Polish footballers
Polish expatriate footballers
GKS Katowice players
Zagłębie Sosnowiec players
Okocimski KS Brzesko players
Ruch Chorzów players
Polonia Bytom players
Patryk Stefański
Stal Stalowa Wola players
Ekstraklasa players
I liga players
II liga players
Living people
People from Mysłowice
Sportspeople from Silesian Voivodeship
Association football midfielders
Expatriate footballers in Iceland